Le Monsieur, le Vampire et Renée Marcelle ("The Gentleman, the Vampire and Renée Marcelle") is a 2009 short animated film produced by Gothique Studios and directed by Oscar Alvarado and Marta Vaquera.

The film was created using Blender technology.

References

External links 
Teaser at the Official Blender website
Freetux - Le Monsieur, le Vampire et Renée Marcelle (in French)

Mexican vampire films
2009 films
2009 animated films
2009 short films
Mexican animated short films
Mexican silent short films
Silent horror films
2000s Mexican films